The Other Girl is a 1917 American comedy film directed by and starring Oliver Hardy.

Cast
 Oliver Hardy as Babe (as Babe Hardy)
 Ethel Marie Burton as Ethel (as Ethel Burton)
 Florence McLaughlin as Florence (as Florence McLoughlin)

See also
 List of American films of 1917

References

External links

1917 films
American silent short films
American black-and-white films
1917 comedy films
1917 short films
Films directed by Oliver Hardy
Silent American comedy films
American comedy short films
1910s American films